Norzivirales is an order of viruses, which infect prokaryotes. Most of these bacteriophages were discovered by metagenomics.

Taxonomy
Norzivirales contains the following four families:

 Atkinsviridae
 Duinviridae
 Fiersviridae
 Solspiviridae

References

Virus orders